The 1921 Harvard Crimson football team represented Harvard University in the 1921 college football season. The Crimson finished with a 7–2–1 record under third-year head coach Bob Fisher.  Walter Camp selected one Harvard player, guard John Fiske Brown, as a first-team member of his 1921 College Football All-America Team.

Schedule

References

Harvard
Harvard Crimson football seasons
Harvard Crimson football
1920s in Boston